Samuel Bennett (March 7, 1884 – January 30, 1969) was an American baseball outfielder in the Negro leagues. He played from 1911 to 1925 with several teams, but he played mostly with the St. Louis Giants/Stars.

References

External links
 and Baseball-Reference Black Baseball stats and Seamheads

1884 births
1969 deaths
Chicago American Giants players
Lincoln Giants players
Louisville White Sox (1914-1915) players
St. Louis Giants players
Dayton Marcos players
Oklahoma Monarchs players
San Antonio Black Bronchos players
Schenectady Mohawk Giants players
St. Louis Stars (baseball) players
St. Louis Giants (1924) players
Baseball outfielders
20th-century African-American people